Street Library Ghana (SLG) is a volunteer-driven, social enterprise based in Ghana that aims to improve the life chances of children and youth in vulnerable communities by addressing literacy and education issues.

SLG offers a cost-effective, less intimidating, and more welcoming library approach in rural communities to reach at-risk and underserved children and provide them with access to quality literature. The modes of operation are a mobile van, a book kiosk, a community and school book box, and digital access. The street library model also involves the use of trained staff or local/international volunteers to actively engage children in activities such as mentoring and leadership training, reading, and educational exercises.

History 

As a child, Hayford grew up in various parts of Ghana because of his father's work. In all those ten communities he lived in before he finished elementary school, he had the opportunity to visit a library only once, and that was in the capital of the Eastern Region of Ghana. He developed a love of reading that eventually helped him enter development work, where he repeatedly encountered many children in rural communities who had no access to books other than their school grades. Many children as old as 18 years were illiterate.When he conducted interviews with villagers in the summer of 2011 as part of health-related field research, he realized the serious impact that a lack of literacy and basic education has on the health of the population. The ignorance-based misunderstandings he experienced were overwhelming and disheartening. This realization eventually led to a profound understanding of some deep-rooted societal issues related to the lack of basic education. In August 2011, Hayford established a mobile library by collecting books from volunteers in his trunk to provide to children in rural villages. Working closely with communities, Hayford drove his car into communities and invited children to read. In early 2012, the Street Library was accepted into Reach for Change's three-year incubation program, which provides funding and technical assistance to help fledgling child-focused initiatives succeed. The Global Fund for Children has also since supported Street Library in various ways to increase its impact, influence, and growth.

Mission and objectives 

Vision
All children in Africa have equal access to literacy, educational and cultural resources.
Mission
SLG addresses the educational needs of children in need in Africa by providing sustainable literacy, cultural resources and personal development.
Methodology
Street Libraries are established in close collaboration with community leaders to create a less intimidating and more welcoming library environment for vulnerable children.
Goals
Improve children's literacy, education, and cultural curiosity
Provide access to a diverse collection of appropriate reading materials
Foster respect for literature and the pursuit of knowledge in participants
Spread the joy of reading
Provide rural youth with opportunities for improved academic development
Provide a low-cost and sustainable library option for rural communities
Preserve indigenous folklore through digitization so that it is easily accessible in roadside libraries
Key Operating Principles
Inclusivity — SLG recognizes that success is built on partnerships and relationships from the strategic support level to local stakeholders who contribute their ideas, experience and expertise.
Local Ownership — Individuals and communities are trained and empowered to manage their own street libraries because true sustainability depends on local actors solving local problems.
Contextual Solutions — SLG aligns its approach with each community to collaboratively develop unique approaches that fulfill its mission and meet community needs.
Systems Change — SLG's programs aim to change the root causes of illiteracy. Lack of access to quality literature is addressed through the direct provision of books and on-site program officers to meet learning needs.

Problems being addressed 

Ghana has a relatively low literacy rate of 71.5% among those over 15 years of age, due in part to a severe lack of educational infrastructure, particularly in rural areas. A chronic lack of interesting reading material inhibits the development of interest in reading. Indeed, the consumption of books and other literature (e.g., newspapers) is relatively low in Ghana. There are numerous reasons for this, including the poor quality and quantity of public libraries (only 63 in a population of 25 million, or about 400,000 people per library), the low average income, the high cost of printed materials, and the lack of appealing publications in both English and other indigenous languages.

The founder and president of Street Library Ghana, Hayford Siaw, asserts that the concept of the street library does not require a physical structure to provide children with the opportunity to read. There is no reason to deny children reading just because the government does not have money to build a library for them.

SLG aims to address the lack of reading material by providing access to a variety of literary styles with high quality and engaging titles. The program differs from traditional library initiatives in that it engages children through activities that make reading and learning enjoyable and worthwhile. This, in turn, is expected to increase academic achievement in all reading-related subjects, setting in motion a positive cycle of improved motivation, achievement, and attitudes toward education.

Programs 

In providing books, library services, and literacy instruction, SLG works with four modalities: mobile van, book box, reading center, and digital app. Each meets needs in a particular way:

Mobile Van
Since 2011, Street Library Ghana has operated a mobile library that visits various communities, bringing both books and staff to engage children in outreach activities. Dedicated staff accompany the van and engage children in activities such as reading and educational exercises. The area of operation for this campaign is Eastern Ghana and the Greater Accra area.
Street Library Book Chest
Book Chests are collections of approximately 150 children's books covering a wide range of reading levels, nonfiction, and fiction genres. They are intended as portable libraries for schools and communities. The mix of carefully selected, high-quality books aims to promote literacy by reinforcing the joy of reading and the pursuit of knowledge. The book chests are packaged in a sturdy, waterproof and airtight box to keep the books in good condition for as long as possible.
Reading Hub / Library Kiosk
Because of the community of people to whom this program is directed, a "street" library" is considered the best approach. When a library is housed in a building, it often seems intimidating to less educated people. An outdoor mobile library, in a friendly and casual atmosphere, makes books more accessible and visible to the entire community and facilitates interpersonal interaction and relationship building. This bypasses the barrier that "real" libraries create without compromising impact. The first permanent library kiosk was completed in 2013 in the Anoff-Damang community in the Eastern Region. The kiosk differs from a regular library building in that it houses the book collection and provides a welcoming and accessible hub for library activities, with shaded seating around it. The architect-designed building is intended to provide a permanent space for the community to conduct library activities on a daily basis, greatly increasing children's access to reading materials and learning opportunities. In the future, it is planned to install the kiosks in a more flexible and cost-effective mobile structure based on shipping containers, rather than concrete and brick.
Street Library App
As part of a mid- to long-term project, the Street Library is working in strategic partnership with international organizations to develop a series of digital innovations that address literacy issues. These are currently in active development and are designed to engage more children in the connected world of communications technology that allows for greater mobility and access to information, as well as broader interaction with one another. This is intended to create the conditions in which tomorrow's citizens, workers and leaders will need to operate.

Partnerships 

Reach for Change 
Global Fund for Children
Tigo Ghana
Viasat 1
Ghana Post
Bayer Care Foundation
TaleXchange
TransCAP Foundation
Architecture Sans Frontiers-UK
Volunteer Partnerships for West Africa
NGO News Africa

Volunteering 

Through its close relationship with Volunteer Partnerships for West Africa (VPWA), SLG has been involved in volunteer recruitment and placement since 2011. It recognizes the role of volunteers in their areas of service. The recruitment process allows both skilled professionals and students to work with SLG and its partner projects, and contributes directly to the achievement of the Millennium Development Goals. Both local and international volunteers are accepted. In addition to volunteering locally, those who are unable to travel to Ghana have the opportunity to work virtually with SLG through the United Nations Online Volunteer Service.

Various opportunities are posted and updated regularly on the SLG and VPWA websites.

Funding 

Street Library Ghana currently relies on multiple funding sources to support its initiatives. As a non-profit organization, Street Library is primarily funded by soliciting grants from committed donors and development agencies, as well as corporate sponsorships. Notable major sponsors include Global Fund for Children, Reach for Change, telecommunications company Tigo, and television company ViaSat 1. Donations are sometimes accepted from civic organizations and individuals through book collections. A placement fee for volunteers provides a regular source of income.

References

External links 
Volunteer Opportunities, VPWA
Street Library Ghana

Libraries in Ghana
Educational organisations based in Ghana
Libraries established in 2011